Yangzi is the pinyin spelling of the Yangtze.

Yangzi may also refer to:

People
 Yang Zhu, also known as Yangzi (Master Yang), ancient Chinese philosopher
 Yang Xiong (author), also known as Yangzi (Master Yang), Han dynasty scholar

Places
 Yangzi, Hubei (洋梓镇), town in Zhongxiang
 Yangzi, Jiangxi (杨椊镇), town in Pengze County
 Yangzi Subdistrict, Chuzhou (扬子街道), in Langya District, Chuzhou, Anhui
 Yangzi Subdistrict, Weifang (央子街道), in Hanting District, Weifang, Shandong

See also
 Yang Zi (disambiguation)